Somebody is an American true crime podcast, hosted by Shapearl Wells, that investigates the shooting and death of her son, Courtney Copeland. The series premiered on March 31, 2020 and is hosted by Copeland's mother Shapearl Wells, Alison Flowers, and Bill Healy. The podcast was a Pulitzer Prize finalist in 2021.

Background
On March 4, 2016, 22-year-old Courtney Copeland was shot in the back and drove himself to a police station on the West Side of Chicago. Copeland exited his BMW convertible and collapsed. He was taken by ambulance to Advocate Illinois Masonic Medical Center. His heart stopped while in the ambulance and he was pronounced dead shortly after arriving at the hospital. After his death, police details, phone records, and witness statements did not match, so Copeland's mother, Shapearl Wells, began investigating his case, hoping to find the truth about her son's death. In 2017, Wells met with Alison Flowers, a journalist who works at The Invisible Institute in Chicago. They decided to record and produce an investigative podcast with hopes of finding the truth. Wells also founded the Copeland Memorial Foundation in Courtney's honor. Copeland attended Jones College Prep High School, where he became friends with Chance the Rapper, who is interviewed in the series and whose song is used as the theme.

Episodes

Awards

See also
List of American crime podcasts

References

External links

See Also 
Whence Came You

2020 podcast debuts
Audio podcasts
Crime podcasts
Investigative journalism
Infotainment
2010s in Chicago
2016 in Illinois
Works about Chicago